Vilborg Yrsa Sigurðardóttir (born in 1963) is an Icelandic writer of both crime novels and children's fiction. She has been writing since 1998.  Her début crime novel was translated into English by Bernard Scudder. The central character in her crime novels so far is Thóra Gudmundsdóttir (Þóra Guðmundsdóttir), a lawyer. Yrsa has also written for children, and won the 2003 Icelandic Children's Book Prize with Biobörn.

Yrsa is married with two children, and she has a career as a civil engineer.

Bibliography

Children's fiction
Þar lágu Danir í því (1998)
Við viljum jólin í júlí (1999)
Barnapíubófinn, Búkolla og bókarræninginn (2000)
B 10 (2001)
Biobörn (2003)

Crime novels

Thóra Gudmundsdóttir series
Þriðja táknið (2005), (English translation by Bernard Scudder: Last Rituals, US:2007, UK:2008)
Sér grefur gröf (2006) (English translation by Bernard Scudder and Anna Yates: My Soul to Take, 2009)
Aska (2007) (English translation by Philip Roughton, Ashes to Dust, UK:2010)
Auðnin (2008) (Veins of Ice) (English translation by Philip Roughton, The Day is Dark, UK:2011)
 Horfðu á mig (2009) (English translation by Philip Roughton, Someone To Watch Over Me, UK:2013)
 Brakið (2011) (English translation by Victoria Cribb, The Silence of the Sea, UK:2014)

Freyja & Huldar (Children's House) series
DNA (2014) (English translation by Victoria Cribb, The Legacy, UK:2017)
 Sogið (2015) (English translation by Victoria Cribb, The Reckoning, UK:2018)
 Aflausn (2016) (English translation by Victoria Cribb, The Absolution, UK:2019)
 Gatið (2017) (English translation by Victoria Cribb, Gallows Rock, UK:2020)
 Brúðan (2018) (English translation by Victoria Cribb, The Doll, UK:2021)
 Þögn (2019) (English translation by Victoria Cribb, The Fallout, UK:2022)

Karólína & Týr series
 Lok, lok og læs (2021)
 Gættu þinna handa (2022)

Non-series novels

Ég man þig (2010) (English translation by Philip Roughton, I Remember You, UK:2012)
Kuldi (2012) (English translation by Victoria Cribb, The Undesired, UK:2015)
 Lygi (2013) (English translation by Victoria Cribb, Why Did You Lie?, UK: 2016)
 Bráðin (2020)

References

External links
 Yrsa on Facebook
 Yrsa Sigurdardóttir author and book translation rights information page at the Salomonsson Agency
 

Sigurdardottir, Yrsa
Sigurdardottir, Yrsa
Icelandic children's writers
Icelandic women children's writers
Icelandic women novelists
Icelandic crime fiction writers
20th-century Icelandic women writers
Sigurdardottir, Yrsa
21st-century Icelandic women writers
20th-century Icelandic novelists
21st-century Icelandic novelists